Darna is a 2005 Philippine television drama fantasy action series broadcast by GMA Network. The series is based on Mars Ravelo's Philippine fictional character of the same name and a loose adaptation of the 2003 Darna comic miniseries published by Mango Comics. Directed by Dominic Zapata and Eric Quizon, it stars Angel Locsin in the title role. It premiered on April 4, 2005 on the network's Telebabad line up. The series concluded on November 25, 2005 with a total of 170 episodes.

Cast and characters

Lead cast
 Angel Locsin as Darna / Narda

Supporting cast
 Alessandra De Rossi as Valentina
 Wendell Ramos as Jeric Frias
 Dennis Trillo as Efren / Lalaking Ahas
 Jeremy Marquez as Jun
 Eddie Garcia as Oscar / Mambabarang
 Christopher de Leon as Ted / Dr. Zombie
 Celia Rodriguez as Braguda
 Gina Pareño as Milagros
 Sandy Andolong as Prospera
 Caridad Sanchez as Aio
 Carmina Villarroel as Sabrina / Sulfura
 Tonton Gutierrez as Mulong / Nosferamus
 Maureen Larrazabal as Aio
 Karen delos Reyes as Alice / Babaeng Tuod / Babaeng Impakta / Babaeng Lobo
 Katrina Halili as Carol / Black Darna
 Cristine Reyes as Molecula
 Ella Guevara as Lenlen 
 Ryza Cenon as Louella / Divas Impaktitas
 C. J. Muere as Ding
 Francis Magundayao as Iking
 Nadine Samonte as Ava

Guest cast
 Lorna Tolentino as Queen Adran 
 Lani Mercado as Ising
 Cogie Domingo as Daniel
 Ara Mina as Dyesebel
 Alice Dixson as Dyangga 
 Rochelle Pangilinan as Corella 
 Charee Pineda as Harrietta 
 Sid Lucero as Jomar
 Anita Linda as Nacyfe 
 Lloyd Samartino as Ramos 
 K Brosas as Divina Demonica
 Bearwin Meily as Toy Master
 Maggie Wilson as Manananggal

Production
Actress Iza Calzado was first approached for the role of Darna. However, due to the requirement for Calzado to lose weight to wear a costume, the role eventually went to Angel Locsin.

Ratings
According to AGB Nielsen Philippines' Mega Manila household television ratings, the pilot episode of Darna earned a 47.1% rating, the highest rating for a pilot episode in Philippine television. The series had its highest rating on April 7, 2005 with a 52.1% rating.

References

External links
 

2005 Philippine television series debuts
2005 Philippine television series endings
Darna
Fantaserye and telefantasya
Filipino-language television shows
GMA Network drama series
Philippine action television series
Superhero television series
Television shows based on comics
Television shows set in the Philippines